is the pen name for a Japanese manga artist known for his writing Manga Kenkanryu (Hate Korean Wave).

His comic books present modern East Asian history, but strongly tilted towards a favorable view of imperial Japan.

References

Manga artists
Japan–Korea relations
Japanese nationalists
1971 births
Living people
Anti-Korean sentiment in Japan